The Upper Housatonic Valley National Heritage Area is a federally designated National Heritage Area in the U.S. states of Connecticut and Massachusetts. The heritage area interprets and promotes the historical, cultural and scenic features of the upper Housatonic River valley in the western part of both states. The heritage area focuses on five themes: the area's role as a resort for writers, artists, actors and musicians, the scenic landscape, the area's role in industry, the American Revolutionary War, and the social and religious groups associated with the area.

The National Heritage Area comprises the towns of Colebrook, Norfolk, North Canaan, Canaan, Salisbury, Sharon, Cornwall, Warren and Kent in Connecticut, and New Marlborough, Sheffield, Mount Washington, Egremont, Alford, Great Barrington, Monterey, Tyringham, Becket, Washington, Lee, Stockbridge, West Stockbridge, Richmond, Lenox, Hancock, Pittsfield, Lanesborough, Dalton and Hinsdale in Massachusetts.

References

External links
 Upper Housatonic Valley National Heritage Area official website

National Heritage Areas of the United States
Colebrook, Connecticut
Norfolk, Connecticut
North Canaan, Connecticut
Canaan (town), Connecticut
Salisbury, Connecticut
Sharon, Connecticut
Cornwall, Connecticut
Warren, Connecticut
Kent, Connecticut
New Marlborough, Massachusetts
Sheffield, Massachusetts
Mount Washington, Massachusetts
Great Barrington, Massachusetts
Monterey, Massachusetts
Tyringham, Massachusetts
Stockbridge, Massachusetts
Lenox, Massachusetts
Pittsfield, Massachusetts